Connor Wallace-Sims (born 29 June 1995) is an English born American professional rugby union player. He plays as a winger for Rugby United New York (RUNY) of Major League Rugby (MLR).

He previously was a part of the professional USA 7s residency programme at Chula Vista, California.

References

1995 births
Living people
American rugby union players
English rugby union players
Rugby union players from Plymouth, Devon
Rugby union wings
Rugby New York players
United States international rugby sevens players